Janik Bastien-Charlebois is an intersex sociology professor, and advocate for intersex rights. She teaches at the Université du Québec à Montréal, and her areas of study include cultural democracy, testimony, epistemology, homophobia and feminism.

Personal life and activism 

In an interview with the Montreal Gazette, and with Être, Bastien-Charlebois describes the medical "normalization" of her body at age 17 as a process of dispossession. Her activism began slowly following a meeting with Curtis Hinkle, the founder of Organisation Intersex International, in Montreal in 2005. She has participated in the second and third International Intersex Forums.

Career 

Janik Bastien-Charlebois is a professor in the Department of Sociology at the Université du Québec à Montréal, where she works in research groups on "Testimonial Cultures", homophobia, and the Institute for Research on Feminist Studies. During 2014 and 2015, Bastien-Charlebois was a visiting scholar at the Centre for Transdisciplinary Gender Studies (Zentrum für transdisziplinäre Geschlechterstudien), Humboldt University of Berlin.

Her book, La virilité en jeu (Manhood at stake), examines the inevitability of boys' homophobic behaviors through interviews with adolescent boys. Bastien-Charlebois disputes arguments focused on human nature and male identity formation, suggesting instead that heterosexuality is socially constructed.

In recent work, Bastien-Charlebois critiques the medical treatment of intersex voices.

Bastien-Charlebois speaks internationally, and has been interviewed by the Montreal Gazette, Le Nouvelliste, Le Devoir and Être.

Selected publications

Book

Journal articles

Editorials

See also 

 Intersex human rights

References

External links 
Page at UQÀM

Year of birth missing (living people)
Living people
Gender studies academics
Intersex academics
Intersex rights activists
Intersex rights in Canada
Intersex women
Intersex writers
Medical sociologists
Academic staff of the Université du Québec à Montréal
Women sociologists